Microcyrtura is a genus of fly in the family Dolichopodidae from Mexico.

Species
Microcyrtura campsicnemoides Robinson, 1964
Microcyrtura lamellata Robinson, 1964
Microcyrtura metatarsalis Robinson, 1964
Microcyrtura oaxacensis Robinson, 1964

References

Medeterinae
Dolichopodidae genera
Diptera of North America
Endemic insects of Mexico
Taxa named by Harold E. Robinson